Thryptomene elliottii is a species of flowering plant in the family Myrtaceae and is endemic to southern central Australia. It is a shrub with decussate, egg-shaped to club-shaped leaves and pink or white flowers with five petals and five stamens.

Description
There are five stamens opposite the sepals. Flowering occurs from April to October.

Taxonomy
Thryptomene elliottii was first formally described in 1875 by Ferdinand von Mueller in Fragmenta phytographiae Australiae from specimens collected by Ernest Giles. The specific epithet (elliottii) honours William Elliott, a horticultural writer of the period.

Distribution and habitat
This thryptomene grows in sandy soils, sometimes in woodland or spinifex grassland along the Transcontinental railway between Loongana in Western Australia and Wynbring in South Australia and as far north as the Musgrave Ranges.

Conservation status
Thryptomene elliottii is classified as "not threatened" by the Western Australian Government Department of Parks and Wildlife.

References

elliottii
Endemic flora of Western Australia
Rosids of Western Australia
Taxa named by Ferdinand von Mueller
Plants described in 1875